is a private university in Sapporo, Hokkaidō, Japan. The precursor of the school was founded in 1885, and it was chartered as a university in 1952.

Organization

Faculties 
Economics
Business Administration
Law
Humanities
Engineering

Graduate Schools 
Economics
Business Administration
Law
Literature
Engineering

Professional Graduate School 
Law School

Alumni 
 Koji Yamase - Footballer
 Yō Ōizumi - Actor

External links 
 Official website (English)

Private universities and colleges in Japan
Educational institutions established in 1885
Universities and colleges in Sapporo
1885 establishments in Japan
Hokkaido American Football Association